The Norfolk robin (Petroica multicolor), also known as the Norfolk Island scarlet robin or Norfolk Island robin, is a small bird in the Australasian robin family Petroicidae. It is endemic to Norfolk Island, an Australian territory in the Tasman Sea, between Australia and New Zealand.

Taxonomy
The robin was considered conspecific with the scarlet robin (Petroica boodang) of Australia, but it was separated in 1999, with the Norfolk Island form as part of the Pacific robin assemblage. It was determined to be a distinct species in 2015.

Description
The Norfolk robin is similar to the Pacific robin, as well as to the scarlet robin. The adult male is distinctive, having upperparts that are mainly black with a large white spot on the forehead, white bars on the wings, and vestigial white tips to the tail. Its breast and upper belly are bright red with the lower belly white. The female is much duller, mainly brown with a pinkish breast. Immature individuals are similar to females. It is the largest of the Pacific robin group, though slightly smaller than the scarlet robin.

Distribution and habitat
The robin is restricted to Norfolk Island, where it is largely confined to the Mt Pitt section of the Norfolk Island National Park and remnant patches of forest nearby. It mainly inhabits the native subtropical rainforest, with lower densities in other wooded habitats. It prefers areas with a dense understorey and an open ground layer with deep, moist litter for foraging in.

Biology
The robin feeds on a wide variety of invertebrates.

Status and conservation
After a period of decline to the 1980s, when the birds disappeared from many parts of the island, the population of the Norfolk robin apparently stabilised and was estimated at 400-500 pairs in 1988 with little change in 1997. Ongoing threats include habitat degradation, and predation by black rats and feral cats. It is considered Endangered on the IUCN Red List because of the restricted size of the population and the small area of its distribution. Ongoing conservation management actions include control of rats and feral cats to minimise predation, as well as control of invasive weeds to minimise habitat degradation. It is proposed to reintroduce the Norfolk robin to nearby Phillip Island, when the regenerating habitat there is suitable.

References

 Commonwealth of Australia. (2005). National Recovery Plan for the Norfolk Island Scarlet Robin, Petroica multicolor multicolor, and the Norfolk Island Golden Whistler Pachycephala pectoralis xanthoprocta. Department of the Environment and Heritage, Canberra.  
 Garnett, Stephen T.; & Crowley, Gabriel M. (2000). The Action Plan for Australian Birds 2000. Environment Australia: Canberra.  
 Higgins, P.J.; & Peter, J.M. (eds). (2003). Handbook of Australian, New Zealand and Antarctic Birds. Volume 6: Pardalotes to Shrike-thrushes. Oxford University Press: Melbourne. 
 Schodde, R.; & Mason, I.J. (1999). The Directory of Australian Birds: Passerines. CSIRO Publishing: Melbourne.

External links
 Australian Government, Dept of the Environment, Water, Heritage and the Arts: Petroica multicolor multicolor

Birds of Norfolk Island
Petroica
Birds described in 1789
Taxa named by Johann Friedrich Gmelin